The Light Heavyweight class in the 1st AIBA African Olympic Boxing Qualifying Tournament competition was the lightest class.  Light Heavyweights were limited to those boxers weighing between 75 - 81 kilograms.

list of boxers

Medalists

Results

Quarterfinal round

Semifinal round

Final Round

Qualification to Olympic games

References
AIBA

AIBA African 2008 Olympic Qualifying Tournament